Aaron Douglas may refer to:

 Aaron Douglas (actor) (born 1971), Canadian actor
 Aaron Douglas (artist) (1899–1979), American painter, illustrator and visual arts educator
 Aaron Douglas (basketball), American basketball player